Pseudoligostigma odulphalis is a moth in the family Crambidae. It was described by Schaus in 1924. It is found in Guatemala.

References

Glaphyriinae
Moths described in 1924